Count , was a politician, and wartime cabinet minister in the Empire of Japan. He was the eldest son of famed Russo-Japanese War general Kodama Gentarō, and his wife was the daughter of Prime Minister Terauchi Masatake.

Biography 

Kodama was born in Yamaguchi Prefecture. After graduating from the Law School of Tokyo Imperial University in 1900, he obtained a position at the Ministry of Finance, passing his career civil service examinations the same year. He served in a number of bureaucratic posts. During the Russo-Japanese War, he was assigned to the Imperial General Headquarters and sent to the Liaodong Peninsula (under Japanese occupation), where he served as liaison between the civilian government in Tokyo and the Japanese general armies in Manchuria. Following the war, he returned to the Finance Ministry as head of the government's Tobacco Monopoly. He was later assigned to serve in the Japanese Government-General of Korea, as a secretary to the Privy Council, and as a member of the House of Peers. Upon his father's death on 23 July 1906, he inherited the title of viscount and took a seat in the House of Peers. After petitioning the Meiji Emperor, the emperor elevated him to count on 2 October 1907 in recognition of his father's service. From 1916 to 1918, he served as Chief Cabinet Secretary. From 26 Sep 1923 to 17 Dec 1927 Kodama was governor of the Kwantung Leased Territory. In the late 1920s, Kodama was the civilian administrator of Korea.
                   
In October 1934, Kodama was picked to be Minister of Colonization under the Okada administration. In February 1937, he became Minister of Communications under the Hayashi administration. From January to July 1940, Kodama served as Home Minister under the Yonai administration. He visited Java in Japanese-occupied Netherlands East Indies as a special advisor in 1942 at the request of the Imperial Japanese Army. In 1944, Kodama served as a Minister without portfolio under the Koiso administration, and from February to April 1945, served as Education Minister in the same administration.

After the surrender of Japan, Kodama was purged from public service by the Supreme Commander of the Allied Powers. He died in 1947, and his grave is at the Tama Cemetery, in Fuchū, Tokyo.

References 
 McNamara, Dennis L. The Colonial origins of Korean Enterprise, 1910–1945. Cambridge University Press, 1990.

External links

 Rulers of China

Notes

Government ministers of Japan
Japanese colonial governors and administrators
1876 births
1947 deaths
Kazoku
Members of the House of Peers (Japan)
Ministers of Home Affairs of Japan
People of the Kwantung Leased Territory
Politicians from Yamaguchi Prefecture
University of Tokyo alumni